Hagwilget Peak is the northernmost mountain in the Rocher Déboulé Range in northern British Columbia, Canada. The  mountain summit is conspicuously situated immediately south of Hazelton, British Columbia. Precipitation runoff from the mountain drains into the Skeena River and Bulkley River. Based on the Köppen climate classification, Hagwilget Peak is located in a subarctic climate zone with cold, snowy winters, and mild summers. Temperatures can drop below −20 °C with wind chill factors below −30 °C. Originally labelled Nil-ke-auda on George Dawson's map for an 1879–80 report for the Geological Survey of Canada, it was later adopted as Awillgate Peak in 1917. The spelling changed to Hagwilget Peak on 1 February 1963, when officially adopted by the Geographical Names Board of Canada to conform with the modern spelling of the namesake village, Hagwilget.

See also

Geography of British Columbia

References

External links
 Weather forecast: Hagwilget Peak

Two-thousanders of British Columbia
Interior Mountains
Bulkley Valley
Hazelton Mountains
Cassiar Land District